Niilo Hartikka (23 April 1909 – 7 October 1998) was a Finnish middle-distance runner. He competed in the men's 1500 metres at the 1936 Summer Olympics.

References

1909 births
1998 deaths
Athletes (track and field) at the 1936 Summer Olympics
Finnish male middle-distance runners
Olympic athletes of Finland
Place of birth missing